Neoitamus is a genus of robber flies in the family Asilidae. There are at least 60 described species in Neoitamus.

Species
These 67 species belong to the genus Neoitamus:

References

Further reading

External links

 
 
 

Asilidae
Asilidae genera